Menelaos Chatzigeorgiou (24 November 1924 – 12 October 2020), surname alternatively transliterated Hatzigeorgiou or Hadjigeorgiou,  was a Greek politician and athlete.

Biography
A native of Thessaloniki, Chatzigeorgiou began his career as a basketball player with Aris B.C. in the 1930s and into the 1940s. After World War II, Chatzigeorgiou competed in swimming, water polo, and track and field for Aris Thessaloniki. He retired in the 1950s and became an administrator for the club, serving as president between 1972 and 1973. Chatzigeorgiou was elected a Member of the European Parliament from Greece in 1990, representing the New Democracy party.

He died on 12 October 2020, aged 95.

References

1924 births
2020 deaths
New Democracy (Greece) MEPs
MEPs for Greece 1989–1994
Greek sportsperson-politicians
Aris B.C. players
Greek men's basketball players
Greek male water polo players
Greek male swimmers
Greek male athletes
Athletes from Thessaloniki
Politicians from Thessaloniki
Basketball players from Thessaloniki
Water polo players from Thessaloniki
Swimmers from Thessaloniki